Robert Andrew Hyman (born April 24, 1950) is an American singer, songwriter, keyboard and accordion player, producer, arranger and recording studio owner, best known for being a founding member of the rock band The Hooters.

Early life

Hyman started taking piano lessons at the age of four and grew up playing in local bands in Meriden, Connecticut, including The Trolls and the Pro-Teens. He attended Francis T. Maloney High School, where he was the editor of the yearbook, "Most Likely to Succeed" and class valedictorian.

While attending the University of Pennsylvania in Philadelphia, where he earned a Bachelor of Science degree in biology, Hyman met future bandmate and composing partner Eric Bazilian and producer Rick Chertoff. In the late 1960s, Hyman and Chertoff, along with local singer David Kagan formed a band called Wax, who recorded an album in the early 1970s. They also released two albums under the group name of Baby Grand in the mid 1970's with Chertoff as the producer.

The Hooters
Hyman and Eric Bazilian formed The Hooters in 1980. The band played its first show on July 4 of that year. They took the band's name from a nickname for the melodica, a type of keyboard harmonica. The Hooters first gained major commercial success in the United States in the mid-1980s due to heavy radio airplay and MTV rotation of several songs, including "All You Zombies", "Day by Day", "And We Danced" and "Where Do the Children Go".

The band played at the Live Aid benefit concert in Philadelphia in 1985, at A Conspiracy of Hope, a benefit concert on behalf of Amnesty International, at Giants Stadium in East Rutherford, New Jersey, and at The Wall Concert in Berlin in 1990.

In 1995, The Hooters went on hiatus, although Hyman and Bazilian would continue to collaborate on musical projects for other artists.

Hyman reunited with The Hooters on headlining European summer tours in 2003, 2004 and 2005.

On May 11, 2004, The Hooters were presented with a Lifetime Achievement Award from the Philadelphia Music Awards.

Other musical projects
In 1983, Hyman and Cyndi Lauper wrote and sang the Billboard number one hit "Time After Time," which earned him a Grammy Award nomination for Song of the Year in 1984.

Hyman collaborated with Patty Smyth on her 1987 solo album Never Enough, Joan Osborne on Relish and Little Wild One, Rick Chertoff on Largo (a concept album based on the largo movement of Antonín Dvořák's Symphony No. 9, in E Minor From the New World), Ricky Martin on the 1999 single "Private Emotion" (originally a Hooters song), Dar Williams on The Beauty of the Rain and My Better Self (2002 and 2005), and Bette Midler.

In 2000, Hyman contributed to the Ron Howard movie How the Grinch Stole Christmas, by co-writing, co-producing, arranging and playing on "Christmas of Love", performed by Little Isidore and The Inquisitors.

Philadelphia Walk of Fame

On November 17, 2000, Hyman was inducted into the Philadelphia Walk of Fame on the Avenue of the Arts.

References

External links

Rob Hyman official website
 
Elmstreet Studios

Living people
1950 births
20th-century American keyboardists
American accordionists
American rock singers
American rock pianists
American male pianists
Melodica players
American male singer-songwriters
The Hooters members
Musicians from Philadelphia
University of Pennsylvania alumni
20th-century American Jews
Singer-songwriters from Pennsylvania
20th-century American pianists
21st-century accordionists
21st-century American keyboardists
21st-century American pianists
20th-century American male musicians
21st-century American male musicians
21st-century American Jews